Chandler is an outer south-eastern suburb in the City of Brisbane, Queensland, Australia.

Geography 

The suburb is bounded to the east by Tingalpa Creek and its southern boundary extends into the Tingalpa Reservoir. The easternmost point of Chandler is the easternmost point of the City of Brisbane mainland (but the easternmost point of the City as a whole is on Moreton Island considerably further east).

Chandler is a semi-rural suburb consisting largely of bushland and residential properties on acreage, close to the major commercial precincts of Carindale and Capalaba.

Chandler is perhaps best known for the Sleeman Centre, a large sporting and entertainment complex.

History 
Chandler was named after the former Lord Mayor of Brisbane, Sir John Beals Chandler.

The town of Tingalpa was surveyed in 1863 with the name of the town changed to Capalaba in 1927. The town was close to a ford of Tingalpa Creek known as The Rocks Crossing which had been identified by surveyor James Warner in 1850. The ford formed part of the route from Brisbane to Cleveland until 1874 when a bridge was built over the creek along Old Cleveland Road.

The Grassdale Land Company Limited formed on 8 January 1885 to acquire the property known as Grassdale Paddocks, in the parish of Tingalpa, with registered shareholders holding 80 shares of 250 pounds each. This area is spread across the Brisbane suburbs of Chandler, Gumdale and Belmont. The company offered the land for auction in the Grassdale Estate later in 1885. The allotments were situated along Grassdale Road, London Road, Boston Road, Old Cleveland Road, Archer Street and four unnamed roads (later called Belmont Road, Stanborough Road, Tilley Road and New Cleveland Road). Prior to the sale extensive publicity was published in the Brisbane newspapers, calling for "the attention of the investor, capitalist, farmer, merchant, artizan [sic], and mechanic, and is only one hour’s drive from Brisbane, and as it has been decided to run the Cleveland Railway through the Estate, it will be brought within a few minutes' ride of the heart of the city".  The results of the public auction on 28 November 1885 were reported in the Telegraph newspaper with "forty-two lots were disposed of, comprising an area of 144 acres..." The Grassdale Land Company Limited later produced a plan of divisions of unsold land into 45 lots, listing the size and value of the lots at the time.

In 1936, a new bridge across Tingalpa Creek was opened to replace the 1874 bridge.

It remained sparsely populated for decades, retaining much of its natural bushland. This lack of population motivated the construction of multiple buildings of the Sleeman Centre for the 1982 Commonwealth Games.

In 2009, the Department of Environment and Resource Management sought public comment on the proposal to discontinue Capalaba West as a suburb and to include the area into Chandler. On 30 April 2010, Capalaba West was absorbed into Chandler. This extended Chandler's eastern border to Tingalpa Creek, separating Brisbane from Redland City, and added a small commercial area along Old Cleveland Road to the suburb.

The median age of the Chandler population was 42 years of age, 5 years above the Australian median. 78.9% of people living in Chandler were born in Australia. The other top responses for country of birth were England (3.4%), New Zealand (2.3%), Italy (1%), Fiji (0.9%), and India (0.8%). 85.2% of people spoke only English at home; the next most popular languages were Italian (2%), Greek (1.5%), Vietnamese (0.9%), Hindi (0.5%), and Dutch (0.4%).

Facilities 
Chandler Transfer Station is a waste transfer station at 728 Tilley Road. It is operated by the Brisbane City Council.

Amenities 

The Sleeman Sports Complex is located at the corner of Old Cleveland & Tilley Roads, and has brought Chandler to prominence during events such as the 1982 Commonwealth Games, the 2001 Goodwill Games, and the 2018 Commonwealth Games. Alongside an auditorium, accommodation, and gardens, it provides facilities for a wide range of sports, including:
 Anna Meares Velodrome, an indoor velodrome
BMX Supercross Track
 Brisbane Aquatic Centre
 Chandler Arena, used for indoor soccer, basketball, badminton, volleyball, martial arts, and ballroom dancing
Chandler Theatre
 Chandler Velodrome, an outdoor velodrome
 Dry Diving Training Hall
 Gymnastics Training Hall
 State Weightlifting Centre
 A fitness centre for cardio, weight training, aerobics and spinning

Situated on Old Cleveland Road, the Complex also features a large TransLink public "Park 'n' ride" facility, to travel by bus to nearby Carindale bus station or Capalaba bus station, and beyond. Once completed, TransLink's Eastern Busway is expected to travel through Chandler, near the Sleeman Centre.There are a number of parks in the area:
 Capalaba Recreation Reserve
 Sunnydene Road Park

 Tilley Road Park (no. 727)

 Tingalpa Creek Reserve

 Toronto Road Park (no.143)

 Toronto Road Park (no.173)

 Tyberry Street Park

References

External links 

 
 
 

Suburbs of the City of Brisbane